Vila Nova de Foz Côa is a city and a municipality in the district of Guarda, Portugal. The city population is around 3,300. Main rivers in the municipal territory include the Douro and the Côa.

The municipality includes parts in the Côa Valley Archaeological site, declared by UNESCO as a World Heritage Site, which partially shares with Figueira de Castelo Rodrigo and Pinhel also located in the Guarda district.

The closest railway station is Pocinho, now the eastern terminus of the Douro railway line. This line (in Portuguese: Linha do Douro) has passenger trains services from Pocinho to Tua, Peso da Régua, Livração, Marco de Canaveses, Penafiel, Paredes, Ermesinde (for connections to Braga, Guimarães, Viana do Castelo, Rio Tinto and Porto).

History 

Vila Nova de Foz Côa received its first charter in 1299, granted by D. Dinis, having been renewed by the same monarch in 1314. In 1514, a new charter was designed by D. Manuel I. In the county there are several monuments, Among which these three national monuments: the castle of Numão, the Pelourinho of Vila Nova de Foz Côa and the Mother Church of the same village, with a Manueline facade. Another important monument in the county is the castle's best castle shale, a Leonese building dating back to the early 13th century, integrated in the region of Riba Côa, which passed into the hands of the Portuguese crown in 1297 by the Treaty of Alcanizes [5]. ].

In its roots, Vila Nova de Foz Côa meets the Palaeolithic man who, with modest artifacts, in the hardness of the schist he has ambitions and projects of his spiritual and material universe, making this sanctuary the largest museum of outdoor rock art, now Heritage of Humanity.

The vestiges of the human occupation, more or less intense, continue through the times castrejos and Romans. The meager witnesses of the Suevi-Visigothic and Arab periods guarantee, however, the continuity of the population nuclei. Contrary to the vicissitudes proper to the frontier lands at these stops, community life proved regular and continuous, beginning in the tenth century.

The royal and seigniorial interest, in the sense of promoting the settlement and development of this region, was confirmed through the granting of charters to the inhabitants of the settlements, giving them legal and administrative importance. In the 19th century, despite having been a scene of disorders, persecutions and fratricidal struggles (the Marçores guerrilla spread terror in the region) that accompanied the implementation of liberalism, the village of Foz Côa took over the leadership of the county, after several constraints that Justified the substitution or absorption of some municipal offices, namely the multiple administrative reforms of the eighteenth century. Nevertheless, the eight pillars that have survived since then, in the area of the present county, testify to the municipal autonomy and are the symbol of the ancestral community life in the Region.

At the end of the parish of Mós do Douro we found traces of ancient occupation in the places of Campanas and Castelo Velho. They will be small fortified settlements of the Bronze Age, to evaluate by the news of finds that arrived at us.

In contrast to what happens in the north-west of Peninsular, in the region of the hot Douro land, the castro civilization has settled not on top of the mountains but on plateaus or small elevations embedded in valleys. Hence, in the first millennium BC, iron men had settled in the zone of the Castle, a place later Romanized and constituted by a small vico, this being evaluated by the area in which the traces of materials of that period predominate. Graves and a funeral inscription (closing with the common acronyms S.T.T.L. - let the earth be light), among other materials, attest to this occupation.

Other places of the term of Mós must have occupied (in the period of Roman occupation or in the Low or High Middle Ages) cases of Aldeia Velha, place of Fontaínhas (often cited as Fontanas).

In 1380, the county of Numão met to appoint its attorney to the courts of Torres Novas. According to the power of attorney, this assignment belonged to João Eanes, from the village of Mós. In the same document, Gonçalo Martins, also of the Mós, also signs as a witness.

In the sixteenth century the parish had a population center of some importance, 52 inhabitants according to the census of 1527, who paid to their abbey a rent of 20,000 réis in the second quarter of the century. Still in the field of ecclesiastical income, it is known that the Bishop charged here the fee of 2,000 reis for parochial confirmation rights.

In the middle of the sixteenth century, the church of the Mós was of the Counts of Marialva, to which belonged the right to appoint the parish priests. Subsequently, a bull of March 14, 1583, allowed the transfer of his possession to the University of Coimbra, leaving their income to revert to the university coffers. It should be recalled that at the time it was common for universities to have their own income, which allowed them to be financially autonomous. The connection to the Coimbrã University is still visible today in numerous epigraphs indicating the limits of university properties.

In monumental terms it is the eighteenth century that is evident, being dated from this period the denominated House of the Fields or Campinhos and the Mother Church. At this time, the Mós already had a population of 317 inhabitants.

The transition from paganism to Christianity must have been made without major clashes since, until the 18th century, the Mother Church (today's cemetery) remained in the same place (Castle). Towards the end of this century, in view of the population growth and expansion of the urban area to the west, the Church was transferred to Largo do Terreiro.

Like all settlements between the Douro and Côa must have collected Jewish families. A characteristic inscription of "new-Christian vote" is placed on one of the doors of a house on Rua do Castelo.

In the eighteenth century an ennobled family certainly marked the economy of the village, flourishing thanks to the use of Sumagre, the culture of the vine, olive oil and almond. Already on March 24, 1758, the Abbot of Mós, responding to the inquiry sent by the Marquis of Pombal throughout the kingdom, answered: "The fruits of this land which the inhabitants gather with greater abundance are olive oil, wheat bread, rye , Barley, lentils, sumac, wine, almonds, onion, bread and wine is the best. "

From these times came a palatial house, with a coat of arms, known as Solar dos Assecas. It belonged to the first Baron of Foz Côa, Francisco António Campos and was later acquired by the Gaspar family.

It had the parish of Mós do Douro, in its history, men connected to the progressive chains. In the midst of the blossoming of Liberalism, someone who was very convinced of the values of the revolution had the words "Et Pluribus Unum" - 1820 (one by one and all by one) engraved over the door of his house, a phrase that fits well with the motto Of the revolutions of the time, coined with the liberation trilogy based on Liberty - Equality - Fraternity.

The Moors suffered at the beginning of the nineteenth century the entry of the Napoleonic troops, after they had occupied Freixo de Numão on January 26, 1811. The population unable to resist left the village sheltering in the hills near the Janvâo, with the exception of the parish priest P António de Almeida. The fratricidal struggles between liberals and absolutists also did not spare the Mós, who saw the death of the soldier Bernardo António Rolo in the siege of Oporto and later José Polido, assassinated by the partisans of the Marçais.

The population growth between the nineteenth and twentieth centuries is certainly due to the Douro railway line, the construction of the Freixo station and the great occupation that was given to the residents of Mós by the Portuguese Railways.

This Parish (in the words of Father Manuel Gonçalves da Costa - "Diocese of Lamego") was never a civil or ecclesiastical center, always attached to Freixo de Numão, although in principle the parish priest enjoyed his own Masses, and be presented by the people. As happened with Freixo, his income was applied to the University of Coimbra on March 14, 1538.

By the middle of the eighteenth century it had three hermitages (all of them of the people and no particular ones): that of Santa Barbara, on a hilltop in front of the town and at a distance from a musket shot; One in the midst of the people, who is of the Lady of Grace, which was where the Most Holy was; Another at the bottom of the town, which is Santo Antonio.

The whole bank of the Douro, in the middle of Mós, was a scene of great bustle in the time of the Roman occupation, because the sands contained much gold. It was the race for the extraction of alluvial gold! In 1758, however, the Abbot of Mós ended with the following description: "I thought that there would be 30 to 40 years when strange men came with instruments of armor and took sands of the river and then purified them and They put them in sticks and they said that it was gold what they carried! " Today, with the river stopped by the reservoirs of the dams, nobody will dare to purify the sands in search of the gold!

In 1854 it no longer belongs to the municipality of Freixo de Numão and integrates the municipality of Vila Nova de Foz Côa.

For more details on the history of this land and these laborious people, nothing better than to refer our readers to the Monograph elaborated by Dr. Joaquim Castelinho.

High in the category of city on July 12, 1997, visiting Vila Nova de Foz Côa is to rediscover history, is to accompany the millennial process that unveils the artistic and cultural heritage in complementarity with the rusticity and the scenic beauty that the region closes and which Deserves its fruition.

Parishes 

Administratively, the municipality is divided into 14 civil parishes (freguesias):

 Almendra
 Castelo Melhor
 Cedovim
 Chãs
 Custóias
 Freixo de Numão
 Horta 
 Muxagata
 Numão
 Santa Comba
 Sebadelhe
 Seixas
 Touça
 Vila Nova de Foz Côa

Demographics

References

External links

Official website
Côa Valley Archaeological Park

Municipalities of Guarda District
Cities in Portugal